Umiray Dumaget Agta is an Aeta language spoken in southern Luzon Island, Philippines.

Location
Umiray Dumaget is spoken along the Pacific coast of eastern Luzon, Philippines from just south of Baler, Aurora to the area of Infanta, Quezon, and on the northern coast of Polillo Island. Himes (2002) reports little dialectal variation.

Reid (1994) reports the following locations for Umiray Dumaget (Central Agta).
Umiray, Quezon
Dibut, San Luis, Aurora
Bunbun, Panakulan, Polillo, Quezon

Phonology

Consonants 

 only appears in loanwords.

Vowels

Classification
Umiray Dumaget is difficult to classify. Himes (2002) posits a Greater Central Philippine connection. However, Lobel (2013) believes that Umiray Dumaget may be a primary branch of the Philippine languages, or may be related to the Northeastern Luzon languages, Sambali-Ayta (Central Luzon), or Manide and Inagta Alabat. According to Lobel (2013), Umiray Dumaget does not subgroup in the Central Philippine or even Greater Central Philippine branches.

References

Philippine languages
Aeta languages
Languages of Quezon
Languages of Aurora (province)